Bon Air, Tennessee may refer to:

Bon Air, Sumner County, Tennessee
Bon Air, White County, Tennessee